Zagtouli Solar Power Station, is an operational  solar power plant in Burkina Faso. At the time of its commissioning, in November 2017, it was one of the largest grid-connected solar power stations in West Africa.

Location

Overview
The power station was developed, and is operated by Cegelec, an electricity engineering firm headquartered in Paris, France. Zagtouli Solar Power Station comprises 129,600 solar panels, each rated at 260 watts. The plant is capable of generating 56 gigawatts-hours of electric energy annually. The power generated at this plant is sold to SONABEL, the national electricity company of Burkina Faso, for integration in the national power grid. The energy produced here costs 45 CFA francs (€0.07) per kilowatt-hour.

Ownership
Zagtouli Solar Power Station is owned and operated by Cegelec, based in France, with major activity in France, Brazil, Indonesia, the Middle East and Africa.

Funding
The cost of construction is reported to be €47.5million (US$56.7 million), through a grant and a loan. The table below illustrates the funding sources for Zagtouli Solar Power Station.

Other considerations
Burkina Faso is only able to produce 60 percent of the electricity it consumes. The remaining 40 percent in imported from neighboring
Ghana and Ivory Coast. The output of this power plant is intended to reduce that energy deficit. In November 2017, there were plans to enlarge the power plant by another 17 megawatts to a total of 50 megawatts.

See also

 List of power stations in Burkina Faso

References

External links
 Burkina Faso launches Sahel region's largest solar power plant As of November 2017.
 Africa: Solar photovoltaic could reach 30 GW in 2030 As of 22 May 2019.

Solar power stations in Burkina Faso
2017 establishments in Burkina Faso
Energy infrastructure in Africa
Energy infrastructure completed in 2017